Guy de Brimeu  known as the great or Gwijde of Brimeu, was a knight of the Golden Fleece, he was beheaded in Ghent on 3 April 1477.

Family 
His father was Jean of Brimeu, Lord of Humbercourt. He married Antonia de Rambures.
Children:
 Charles of Brimeu
 Adrian of Brimeu, Lord of Humbercourt: Died in the battle of Marignano.
 Eustache of Brimeu, married Barbara of Hillery
 Charlotte of Brimeu
 Anne Of Brimeu, married John III of Glymes,  Lord of Bergen op Zoom.
Anthony of Glymes, Marquess of Berghes.
Robert of Berghes
 Lamberte of Brimeu, married Ferry of Croy.
 Guye of Brimeu

Career 
Jean of Croÿ, Lord of Roeulx gifted the dominium of Wesemael to Guy of Brimeu in 1471 and he became the new Marshal of Brabant. He was introduced into the Order of the Golden Fleece on 9 May 1473. He was a personal friend and member of the court of the Duke of Burgundy, Charles the Bold.

Execution 
Mary of Burgundy tried to save his life, but Guy was beheaded in Ghent after torture on 3 April 1477.

References

Brimeu family
Knights of the Golden Fleece
Publicly executed people
People executed by decapitation